Peggy DesAutels is an American academic working as a professor of philosophy at the University of Dayton. Her research focuses on moral psychology, feminist philosophy and philosophy of mind and cognitive science.

Education 
DesAutels received her Ph.D. in Philosophy from Washington University in St. Louis in 1995 after earning an M.S. in computer science and an M.A. in philosophy.

Career 
From 2010 to 2013, DesAutels served as the chair of the Committee on the Status of Women of the American Philosophical Association; she currently serves as an ex officio member of the committee as the Director of the Site Visit Program.

As chair of the Committee on the Status of Women of the American Philosophical Association, DesAutels was outspoken against the problems facing women philosophers. She criticized the lack of gender parity in philosophy, as well as the prevalence of sexual harassment in academia, the underrepresentation of women philosophers in tenure-track positions, and the number of philosophy conferences with all-male lineups. DesAutels was named Distinguished Woman in Philosophy for 2014 by the Eastern Division of Society for Women in Philosophy.

DesAutels was also a research leader on a $3 million National Science Foundation (NSF) ADVANCE grant, awarded to a consortium including University of Dayton, aimed at advancing the recruitment and advancement of women in STEM (science, technology, engineering, and mathematics) fields.

Publications 
DesAutels is the editor of several volumes in feminist ethics and moral psychology.

  Selected as a Choice outstanding academic title for 2003.

References

American women philosophers
Feminist philosophers
Moral psychologists
20th-century American philosophers
21st-century American philosophers
American ethicists
Philosophers of mind
Living people
Year of birth missing (living people)
20th-century American women
21st-century American women
Washington University in St. Louis faculty